The Association of Radicals for the United States of Europe was a radical liberal political party in the Czech Republic, which existed between 1990 and 2003. The party sought to create a United States of Europe. It was founded by Richard Stockar after the Velvet Revolution in Czechoslovakia.

References

Political parties established in 1990
Political parties disestablished in 2001
Defunct political parties in the Czech Republic
1990 establishments in Czechoslovakia
Political parties in Czechoslovakia
Radical parties
European federalist parties
Pro-European political parties in the Czech Republic